Megaloodes politus is a species of beetle in the family Carabidae, the only species in the genus Megaloodes.

References

Licininae
Monotypic Carabidae genera